Mallobathra angusta is a moth of the family Psychidae. This species is endemic to New Zealand.

Taxonomy 
This species was described by Alfred Philpott in 1928 using a male specimen collected at the Mount Arthur tableland track at 3000 ft. George Hudson discussed and illustrated this species in his 1939  book A supplement to the butterflies and moths of New Zealand. The holotype is held at the New Zealand Arthropod Collection.

Description 

Philpott described the adult of this species as follows:

Distribution

This species is endemic to New Zealand and has been collected at Mount Arthur.

Behaviour
Adults of this species are on the wing in November.

References 

Moths described in 1928
Moths of New Zealand
Psychidae
Endemic fauna of New Zealand
Taxa named by Alfred Philpott
Endemic moths of New Zealand